Peyton Nicole Booker, known professionally as Peyton, is an American singer-songwriter from Houston, Texas.

Early life
Peyton was born and raised in Houston, Texas. He began learning the violin at five and grew up singing in church every Sunday and performing in classical ensembles. Peyton's late grandmother, Theola Booker, was a formative inspiration who not only composed and arranged music for renowned gospel musician Reverend James Cleveland, of which she received a Grammy Award nomination for her work behind the scenes, but also taught piano for decades at Peyton's elementary school.

Musical career
In 2015, Peyton collaborated with Steve Lacy of The Internet for the track ‘Verbs’, and in that same year she released her debut EP Roller Coaster. She soon after released the song ‘Sweet Honey’, which caught the ear of Peanut Butter Wolf, who signed Peyton to Stones Throw. The track was featured on season 3 of Issa Rae’s hit HBO series Insecure. In 2019, Peyton released her debut Stones Throw EP Reach Out.

In June 2021, Peyton released her first studio album on Stones Throw, PSA. The album was executively produced by Biako and includes producers Keys N Krates, Vicky Farewell, Julia Lewis, Chase of Nazareth, McClenney and Jay Anthony, as well as a guest appearance from rapper Brice Blanco. The album received favourable reviews from outlets such as Pitchfork, which described it as a "pensive and lighthearted account of the trials and delights of young adulthood... its sunny, carefree music harkening to the days of R&B as the soundtrack of coming of age", and on AllMusic, which described her as an "idiosyncratic creative force".

Artistry
In an interview with OkayPlayer about her artistry, Peyton said, “I am told often that I am a strong lyricist, and that my voice is refreshing because of the sense of familiarity in my voice that gives a feeling of nostalgia with a different approach.”  Peyton has musical roots in gospel, soul, jazz, classical, and folk. Her passion for contemporary electronic music, hip-hop and R&B is all blended into her music.

Peyton cites Erykah Badu, The Pharcyde, The Neptunes, N.E.R.D., Mew, The Cardigans, Grizzly Bear, Kanye West and the biggest of them all, Amel Larrieux, as her influences. In the interview with OkayPlayer, Peyton says “I have been a fan of her music for as long as I can remember. I would listen to her music a lot because my dad would play her music in the house and on car rides. Her music reminds me of home. She has a very angelic voice and sings with such conviction and passion that makes you really feel the message she’s giving”.

Discography

EPs

Singles

Albums

Soundtracks

References

External links
 

Living people
Musicians from Los Angeles
American record producers
American artists
Stones Throw Records artists
1997 births